In enzymology, a 2,3,4,5-tetrahydropyridine-2,6-dicarboxylate N-succinyltransferase is an enzyme that catalyzes the chemical reaction

succinyl-CoA + (S)-2,3,4,5-tetrahydropyridine-2,6-dicarboxylate + H2O  CoA + N-succinyl-L-2-amino-6-oxoheptanedioate

The 3 substrates of this enzyme are succinyl-CoA, (S)-2,3,4,5-tetrahydropyridine-2,6-dicarboxylate, and H2O, whereas its two products are CoA and N-succinyl-L-2-amino-6-oxoheptanedioate.

This enzyme belongs to the family of transferases, specifically those acyltransferases transferring groups other than aminoacyl groups.  The systematic name of this enzyme class is succinyl-CoA:(S)-2,3,4,5-tetrahydropyridine-2,6-dicarboxylate N-succinyltransferase. Other names in common use include tetrahydropicolinate succinylase, tetrahydrodipicolinate N-succinyltransferase, tetrahydrodipicolinate succinyltransferase, succinyl-CoA:tetrahydrodipicolinate N-succinyltransferase, succinyl-CoA:2,3,4,5-tetrahydropyridine-2,6-dicarboxylate, and N-succinyltransferase.  This enzyme participates in lysine biosynthesis.

Structural studies

References

 

EC 2.3.1
Enzymes of known structure